The  is an Edo period historical analysis of Japanese history written in 1712 by Arai Hakuseki (1657–1725).

Hakuseki's innovative effort to understand and explain the history of Japan differs significantly from previous chronologies which were created by other writers, such as 
 Gukanshō (circa 1220) by Jien, whose work evidenced a distinctly Buddhist perspective; or
 Jinnō Shōtōki (1359) by Kitabatake Chikafusa, whose work evidenced a distinctly Shinto perspective; or
 Nihon Ōdai Ichiran (1652) by Hayashi Gahō, whose work evidenced a distinctly neo-Confucian perspective.

Hakuseki's work avoids such easy categorization, and yet, he would have resisted being labeled non-Shinto, non-Buddhist, or non-Confucianist in his life or work.  His analytical approach to history differed from his predecessors in that the Tokushi Yoron identifies a process of transferring power across generations.  Earlier Japanese histories were intended, in large part, to be construed as documenting how the past legitimizes the present status quo.  
 
Tokushi Yoron is not without its problems.  Hakuseki has been criticized for being overly casual in identifying the sources he used in writing.  For example, he borrowed extensively from Hayashi Gahō's Nihon Ōdai Ichiran; but he felt no need to acknowledge this fact.  Nevertheless, the organizing schema of Tokushi Yoron presented the periodization of history on the basis of changes in political power; and this rational stance sets this work apart from its sources.

See also
 Historiographical Institute of the University of Tokyo
 International Research Center for Japanese Studies
 Japanese Historical Text Initiative
 Historiography of Japan

Notes

External links
 読史余論抄

References
 Ackroyd, Joyce, tr. (1980). Told Round a Brushwood Fire: The Autobiography of Arai Hakuseki (UNESCO Collection of Representative Works: Japanese series). Princeton: Princeton University Press.   [reprinted by University of Tokyo Press, Tokyo, 1995.  (cloth)]
 _. (1982) Lessons from History: The Tokushi Yoron. Brisbane: University of Queensland Press.  ; OCLC 7574544 
 Brown, Delmer M. and Ichiro Ishida, eds. (1979). Gukanshō; "The Future and the Past: a translation and study of the 'Gukanshō,' an interpretive history of Japan written in 1219" translated from the Japanese and edited by Delmer M. Brown & Ichirō Ishida. Berkeley: University of California Press.  
 Brownlee, John S. (1997) Japanese historians and the national myths, 1600-1945: The Age of the Gods and Emperor Jimmu. Vancouver: University of British Columbia Press.   Tokyo: University of Tokyo Press.  (cloth)
 _. (1991). Political Thought in Japanese Historical Writing: From Kojiki (712) to Tokushi Yoron (1712). Waterloo, Ontario: Wilfrid Laurier University Press. 
 Titsingh, Isaac. (1834).  Annales des empereurs du Japon (Nihon Odai Ichiran).  Paris: Royal Asiatic Society, Oriental Translation Fund of Great Britain and Ireland. OCLC 5850691 
 Varley, H. Paul, ed. (1980). [ Kitabatake Chikafusa, 1359], Jinnō Shōtōki ("A Chronicle of Gods and Sovereigns: Jinnō Shōtōki of Kitabatake Chikafusa" translated by H. Paul Varley). New York: Columbia University Press.  
 Yamashita, Samuel Hideo. "Yamasaki Ansai and Confucian School Relations, 1650-16751" in Early Modern Japan, (Fall 2001).  Ann Arbor: University of Michigan.

Edo-period works
Historiography of Japan
Japanese studies
1712 books
History books about Japan
Edo-period history books